The 2012 Rallye Deutschland is the ninth round of the 2012 World Rally Championship season. Based in Trier, Rhineland-Palatinate, the event took place from 24–26 August. The rally was also the sixth round of the World Rally Championship for Production cars, and the fifth round of the World Rally Championship Academy.

Results

Event standings

Notes
 — The WRC Academy only competes on the first two days of the rally.

Special stages

Power stage
The Power stage was a short 4.37 km stage run through the streets of Trier known as the Circus Maximus. The three fastest crews through this stage were awarded by drivers' championship points. Sébastien Loeb was the fastest driver through the stage, earning three additional championship points. His teammate, Mikko Hirvonen was second, while Volkswagen Motorsport driver Andreas Mikkelsen finished third. The single point Mikkelsen earned marked the first time a S2000 car scored points on a Power stage.

References

Deutschland
Rallye Deutschland
Rallye Deutschland